Harry Webb (1889 – 1962) was a British communist activist.

Born in Norton, now a suburb of Sheffield, Webb followed his sister Lily in moving to Ashton-under-Lyne to work in a cotton mill.  He joined the Socialist Labour Party (SLP) when he was 17, although the party had few members in the Manchester area.  At the January 1910 UK general election, he campaigned for William McGee, an independent labour candidate in Ashton-under-Lyne.

Following the October Revolution, Webb supported the formation of a single, national, communist party, and signed the manifesto of the Communist Unity Group, a split from the SLP.  This led him into the Communist Party of Great Britain (CPGB), and he was elected to its executive in 1921, arguing against Parliamentarianism and the affiliation of the CPGB to the Labour Party.  The same year, he became a CPGB organiser in Sheffield.

In 1923, Webb moved to Salford and became active in the Salford South Divisional Labour Party, alongside many other CPGB members.  In 1928, he moved to Liverpool to become a CPGB organiser there.  During World War II, he moved to Manchester.  He was the CPGB's Prospective Parliamentary Candidate for Ashton in 1947, but when the 1950 general election was held, he did not stand.

References

1889 births
1962 deaths
Communist Party of Great Britain members
Socialist Labour Party (UK, 1903) members
People from Sheffield